Koh Russei, Koh Russey or Bamboo Island (Khmer: កោះឬស្សី) is one of a group of small islands in the Gulf of Thailand, located about  off the coast of Sihanoukville city in southern Cambodia. It is administered by Prey Nob District in Sihanoukville Province.

For many years, Koh Russey served exclusively as a small outpost of the Cambodian Navy. However, increasing development and rising tourist numbers in Sihanoukville brought tourism to the island. The investment company Citystar is currently developing a low-density villa community as well as a luxury hotel, that will follow EarthCheck bench-marking and certification. The project is planned to be completed in 2016 and going to serve hotels and resorts.

See also  
Koh Rong
Koh Rong Sanloem
Koh Sdach
 List of islands of Cambodia
List of Cambodian inland islands
Sihanoukville

References

External links

Cambodia's Islands
Cambodian Tourism - Koh Russey Island website

Islands of Cambodia
Islands of the Gulf of Thailand
Geography of Koh Kong province